The Conecuh Valley Railway, L.L.C.  connects with the CSX at Troy, Alabama, and travels  to Goshen, Alabama.  This short line railroad was created after 2001 from the former Southern Alabama Railroad and is currently owned and operated by Genesee & Wyoming.

Commodities include poultry feed, plastics, vegetable oil, assorted food products, and railcar storage, generating approximately 3,000 annual carloads.

In April 2011, the Conecuh Valley Railway was named as one of the three railroads to be purchased by RailAmerica from Gulf and Ohio for $12.7 million. In 2012, RailAmerica was purchased by Genesee and Wyoming.

History
Originally constructed by the Mobile and Girard Railroad (later Central of Georgia) from Columbus to Searight between 1870 - 1891, the line eventually connected with the Louisville and Nashville Railroad at Andalusia, Alabama.  The Central of Georgia became part of the Southern Railway in 1963, and the Southern Railway became part of the Norfolk Southern Railway in 1990.

The remainder of the original Mobile and Girard railroad was sold by the Southern Railway to the Southern Alabama Railroad on October 31, 1988, and was under the control of the Abernathy Group.  The line was later sold by the Southern Alabama Railroad to Conecuh Valley Railroad (Gulf & Ohio Railways) on October 22, 2001.

The previous owner, the Southern Alabama Railroad, allowed the line outside of Troy to Goshen to deteriorate to the point that the line was no longer usable. In 2002 it was rehabilitated with funds obtained from the USDA as well as the state in order to restore service to peanut producers in Goshen.

Locomotives

External links
Conecuh Valley Railway official webpage - Genesee and Wyoming website
HawkinsRails' Conecuh Valley Railroad page

References

Alabama railroads
Gulf and Ohio Railways